Badichowdi is one of the best-known commercial suburbs in Hyderabad, the capital city of Telangana, India.

Commercial area
The commercial area of Badichowdi features a large shopping mall, mainly for women's clothes and silverware, as well as a vegetable market.

Transport
The state run TSRTC is near a large bus junction. The closest MMTS train station is at Kachiguda or Malakpet.

School
Badichowdi has two Schools: Cambridge High School and Ahilya Education Society

References

Neighbourhoods in Hyderabad, India